Eternal Sunshine of the Spotless Mind is a 2004 American romantic science–fiction comedy–drama film written by Charlie Kaufman and directed by Michel Gondry. Jim Carrey and Kate Winslet lead the ensemble as an estranged couple who have each other erased from their memories. The film was released in theatres on March 19, 2004, by Focus Features and has since gained cult status. It has grossed over $72 million at box office worldwide.

The film received strong critical reviews for its plot structure and performances and received various accolades in different award categories. At 77th Academy Awards, the film won Academy Award for Best Original Screenplay for Kauffman, Gondry and Pierre Bismuth. The film received Best Original Screenplay award, including those given by Writers Guild of America, National Board of Review, London Film Critics, and BAFTA, where it additionally won BAFTA Award for Best Editing along with four other nominations including, BAFTA Award for Best Actor in a Leading Role and BAFTA Award for Best Actress in a Leading Role for Carrey and Winslet, respectively.

Both Carrey and Winslet were recognized for their performance and earned several Best Actor and Best Actress nominations apart from BAFTA, including from Golden Globe Awards, Satellite Awards, and Saturn Awards. In addition, Winslet also received Academy Award for Best Actress nomination and went on to win Best Actress award from Empire Awards, London Film Critics, and Online Film Critics Society, among others. Premiere magazine named Winslet's portrayal of Clementine Kruczynski in the film as the 81st greatest film performance of all time.

The film also received nominations from Grammy Awards, César Awards, and AFI. American Film Institute nominated the film for AFI's 100 Years...100 Movies (10th Anniversary Edition) and AFI's 10 Top 10 – Science Fiction Films. Time Out New York ranked the film as the third–best of the decade, while Writers Guild of America awarded the film Best Original Screenplay and ranked the film at #24 on its list of "101 Greatest Screenplays" in 2013.

Awards and nominations

Organizations

Guilds

Film festivals

Critics groups

Audience Award

References

External links
 

Lists of accolades by film